Ryan Matthew Kelly (born April 9, 1991) is an American professional basketball player for the Sun Rockers Shibuya of the B.League in Japan. He played college basketball for Duke University.

High school career
Kelly was a four-year forward at Ravenscroft School in Raleigh, North Carolina. He holds school career records in points (2,065), points per game (17.5), blocks (379), rebounds (950), free throws (312), field goals (864) and field goal percentage (.600, 864-of-1441). He also has single season records in points (882), points per game (25.2), rebounds (356), free throws (134), field goals (336) and field goal percentage (.620, 297-of-479). As a Sophomore, Kelly averaged 14.2 PPG, 8.7 rebounds, and 3.9 blocks. As a Junior, Kelly averaged 23.7 points, 8.1 rebounds and 3.1 blocks while leading his team to a 24–6 record and fifth-place finish in the state. He led Ravenscroft to a 28–7 record as a senior, posting 25.2 points, 10.2 rebounds, 2.8 blocks, 2.0 assists and 1.7 steals per game on the year. He was named a 2009 McDonald's All-American, as well as a Jordan Brand All-American and rated in the top 20 overall by Scout.com (No. 12), ESPN.com (No. 17) and Rivals.com (No. 20).

College career

Kelly committed to play for Duke under coach Mike Krzyzewski. During his freshman season, Kelly played backup to forward Kyle Singler, only playing in 35 games averaging 1.2 points per game. Kelly's sophomore year he was called on more, averaging 6.6 points, 3.7 rebounds and 1.4 blocks per game, in 37 games for the Blue Devils. For his junior season Kelly was asked to be team captain, playing in 31 games and starting in 19. He averaged 11.8 points, 5.4 rebounds, 1.1 assists and 1.1 blocks per game. He missed the last part of the season due to a foot injury. His senior year, Kelly was again bothered early in the year by the same foot injury, which had him sidelined for several weeks. He finished his career at Duke averaging 12.9 points, 1.6 blocks, and 5.3 rebounds. He was also named to the ACC All-Academic Team all 4 years at Duke.

Professional career

Los Angeles Lakers (2013–2016)
Kelly was selected by the Los Angeles Lakers with the 48th overall pick in the 2013 NBA draft. On September 20, 2013, he signed with the Lakers. During his rookie season, he had multiple assignments with the Los Angeles D-Fenders of the NBA Development League. On February 5, 2014, he scored a career-high 26 points in a 119–108 win over the Cleveland Cavaliers.

On June 29, 2014, the Lakers tendered a $1 million qualifying offer to make Kelly a restricted free agent. On July 21, 2014, Kelly re-signed with the Lakers to a two-year deal. On January 30, 2015, he was reassigned to the D-Fenders, only to be recalled the next day.

During the 2015–16 season, Kelly received multiple assignments to the Los Angeles D-Fenders.

Atlanta Hawks and Maine Red Claws (2016–2017)
On September 20, 2016, Kelly signed with the Atlanta Hawks. However, he was waived by the Hawks on October 19 after appearing in six preseason games. He went on to sign with the Boston Celtics on October 21, but was waived the following day. He later re-signed with the Hawks on October 31. On January 6, 2017, he was waived by the Hawks after appearing in nine games. On January 13, 2017, Kelly was acquired by the Maine Red Claws of the NBA Development League. On February 24, 2017, Kelly returned to the Hawks after signing a multi-year contract with the team.

On June 28, 2017, Kelly was traded to the Houston Rockets in exchange for cash considerations. He was later waived on July 7, 2017; the Rockets made the move before his $1.5 million contract for 2017–18 became guaranteed.

Spain (2017–2018)
On September 12, 2017, Kelly signed with Real Betis Energía Plus of the Spanish Liga ACB.

Japan (2018–present)
In 2018, Kelly signed with the Sun Rockers Shibuya of the Japanese B.League.

Career statistics

NBA

Regular season

|-
| style="text-align:left;"| 
| style="text-align:left;"| L.A. Lakers
| 59 || 25 || 22.2 || .423 || .338 || .815 || 3.7 || 1.6 || .5 || .8 || 8.0
|-
| style="text-align:left;"| 
| style="text-align:left;"| L.A. Lakers
| 54 || 32 || 23.7 || .337 || .336 || .832 || 2.8 || 1.8 || .6 || .5 || 6.4
|-
| style="text-align:left;"| 
| style="text-align:left;"| L.A. Lakers
| 36 || 0 || 13.1 || .369 || .135 || .685 || 3.4 || .6 || .4 || .3 || 4.2
|-
| style="text-align:left;"| 
| style="text-align:left;"| Atlanta
| 9 || 0 || 5.2 || .300 || .400 || 1.000 || 1.1 || .6 || .4 || .2 || 1.1
|- class="sortbottom"
| style="text-align:center;" colspan="2"| Career
| 156 || 59 || 19.6 || .380 || .314 || .797 || 3.2 || 1.4 || .5 || .5 || 6.2

College

|-
| style="text-align:left;"| 2009–10
| style="text-align:left;"| Duke
| 35 || 0 || 6.5 || .356 || .263 || .667 || 1.1 || .4 || .2 || .4 || 1.2
|-
| style="text-align:left;"| 2010–11
| style="text-align:left;"| Duke
| 37 || 27 || 20.1 || .516 || .319 || .805 || 3.7 || .8 || .7 || 1.4 || 6.6
|-
| style="text-align:left;"| 2011–12
| style="text-align:left;"| Duke
| 31 || 19 || 25.9 || .444 || .408 || .807 || 5.4 || 1.1 || .8 || 1.0 || 11.8
|-
| style="text-align:left;"| 2012–13
| style="text-align:left;"| Duke
| 23 || 23 || 28.9 || .453 || .422 || .812 || 5.3 || 1.7 || .7 || 1.6 || 12.9
|-
| style="text-align:center;" colspan="2"|Career
| 126 || 69 || 19.3 || .460 || .379 || .805 || 3.7 || .9 || .6 || 1.1 || 7.5

Personal life
Kelly is the son of Chris and Doreen Kelly. His father played basketball at Yale University, and his mother played volleyball at the University of Pennsylvania. He is married to Lindsay Cowher, the daughter of former NFL player and coach, Bill Cowher. His younger brother, Sean, joined the Duke Blue Devils in July 2014 as a walk-on for the 2014–15 season. Through his marriage, Kelly is the brother-in-law of former Los Angeles Kings forward Kevin Westgarth.

References

External links

 NBA D-League profile
 Duke bio

1991 births
Living people
American expatriate basketball people in Japan
American expatriate basketball people in Spain
American men's basketball players
Atlanta Hawks players
Basketball players from New York (state)
Real Betis Baloncesto players
Duke Blue Devils men's basketball players
Liga ACB players
Los Angeles D-Fenders players
Los Angeles Lakers draft picks
Los Angeles Lakers players
Maine Red Claws players
McDonald's High School All-Americans
Parade High School All-Americans (boys' basketball)
People from Carmel, New York
Power forwards (basketball)
Ravenscroft School alumni
Sportspeople from the New York metropolitan area
Sun Rockers Shibuya players